Úny is a village in Komárom-Esztergom county, Hungary.

External links
 Street map (Hungarian)

Populated places in Komárom-Esztergom County